Ecnomiomorpha aurosa is a species of moth of the family Tortricidae. It is found in the Federal District of Brazil.

References

Moths described in 1999
Euliini
Moths of South America
Taxa named by Józef Razowski